Csaba Ökrös (born 26 May 1969, in Debrecen) is a Hungarian handball player, coach and university professor. Currently, Ökrös serves as the head coach for Váci NKSE, having taken the position from András Németh who re-joined his former club Hypo Niederösterreich in the autumn of 2011.

Formerly, Ökrös worked for Testnevelési Főiskola SE, Dunaferr SE, Everyday Orosháza and PLER KC. He also managed the Hungarian national team in younger age categories and led the national team of university and college students.

Achievements
Nemzeti Bajnokság I:
Bronze Medalist: 2002
Magyar Kupa:
Bronze Medalist: 2002
EHF Cup Winners' Cup:
Semifinalist: 2002
University World Championship:
Winner: 2000
Silver Medalist: 1998

References

External links
 Curriculum Vitae of Csaba Ökrös, Semmelweis University – Faculty of Physical Education and Sport Sciences

1969 births
Living people
Sportspeople from Debrecen
Hungarian male handball players
Hungarian handball coaches